The 1897 All-Ireland Senior Football Championship was the 11th staging of Ireland's premier Gaelic football knock-out competition. The Munster final saw Cork ending Limerick's All Ireland title. Dublin were the winners.

Results

Leinster

Munster

All-Ireland final

Championship statistics

Miscellaneous
 Dublin begin their 1st All Ireland triple and the first county ever to do it.

References

All-Ireland Senior Football Championship